Plysky is a selo in Nizhyn Raion, Chernihiv Oblast, Ukraine. It hosts the administration of Plysky rural hromada, one of the hromadas of Ukraine. The village has a population of 1,333.

Here was born American biologist Alexander Petrunkevitch.

Until 18 July 2020, Plysky belonged to Borzna Raion. The raion was abolished in July 2020 as part of the administrative reform of Ukraine, which reduced the number of raions of Chernihiv Oblast to five. The area of Borzna Raion was merged into Nizhyn Raion.

References

External links
 Plysky at the Verkhovna Rada of Ukraine site
 The murder of the Jews of Plysky during World War II, at Yad Vashem website.

Borznyansky Uyezd
Holocaust locations in Ukraine

Villages in Nizhyn Raion